Saarathi is a 2011 Indian Kannada-language romantic action film written and directed by Dinakar Thoogudeep. It stars Darshan and debutante Deepa Sannidhi in the lead roles. V. Harikrishna scored for the film's background and its soundtrack, lyrics for which was penned by V. Nagendra Prasad.

The film released theatrically on 30 September 2011  when the Darshan was under judicial custody for alleged domestic violence against his wife, Vijayalakshmi. It received three awards at the 2011 Karnataka State Film Awards, including the Best Entertaining Movie. The core plot of the movie was reported to be based on the 1994 animated movie The Lion King.

Synopsis

Raja, an auto-rickshaw driver, who falls in love with Rukmini. But she has an enemy in Pratap, a relative who wants to marry her, and takes her to his hometown - Durgakote. Raja follows her to the place and finds that she hails from the family of palegars who rule the place. The story takes a turn when Raja finds that Rukmini is the daughter of his father's sister.

Cast
 Darshan as Raja / Krishna
 Deepa Sannidhi as Rukmini
 R. Sarathkumar as Suryanarayana
 Seetha as Raja's mother
 Rangayana Raghu as Raja's adoptive father
 Sharath Lohitashwa as Nagappa, Suryanarayana's brother
 Ajay as Pratap, Nagappa's son
 Bullet Prakash as Raja's friend
 Viswa
 Dileep
 Kote Prabhakar as Pratap's henchman
 Muni as Pratap's henchman
 Lokesh Kademani

Production
Saarathi was initially under the production of Kannada cinema veteran KCN Chandrashekhar, but was later taken up by K. V. Satya Prakash as his first film venture. As a result of which, the film has been in the making for over 2 years  including 90 days for the shooting and later the film release got delayed owing to actor Darshan's arrest by the police following a complaint of domestic violence by his wife Vijayalakshmi. It was filmed at major South Indian tourist places like Chitradurga, Pondicherry, Chalakudy (in Kerala) and Hyderabad, the film ran 100 days in around 17 theaters.

Music

The music and Background score was composed by V. Harikrishna and lyrics for songs were penned by Nagendra Prasad

Release 

The film released in 157 theatres across Karnataka on 30 September 2011, including over 30 in the city of Bangalore, and an additional 20 screens were put up due to its commercial success in the opening weekend.

Reception

Critical response 

A critic from The Times of India scored the film at 4 out of 5 stars and says "Hats off to Darshan for his fabulous performance, excellent dialogue delivery and body language. Debutant Deepa Sannidhi steals your heart with a lively show. Rangayana Raghu, Sharath Lohithashwa, Sharath Kumar, Ajay have given life to their roles. Music is good with V Harikrishnas catchy tunes and Nagendra Prasads lively lyrics. Cinematography by Krishnakumar is eye-catching. Eshwarikumar needs special mention for his brilliant art work". Sunayana Suresh from DNA wrote "Cinematography by Krishnakumar is top notch and he's done a great job with the action sequences. Director Dinakar Thoogudeepa has created a film that's well on the lines of big Tollywood entertainers like Magadheera. This film is worth your three hours, go and get entertained". A critic from Bangalore Mirror wrote  "Overall, it’s a film to enjoy and one of the better entertainers of the year. But only if you manage to remember that whenever  Darshan says that he protects the people he loves, it is his character that is talking and not the person. Mind it!". Shreyas Nag from Deccan Herald wrote "Rangayana Raghu and Bullet Prakash’s timing is just perfect with both of them complementing each other, making the audience laugh their guts off.  Though it is a mass entertainer, the songs and the setting of the location puts it on a par with other big banner movies". A critic from News18 India wrote "Tamil actor Sharath Kumar makes a dignified presence in the role of Darshan's father. 'Sarathi' is certainly more than a paisa vasool film. Darshan fans will immensely like it".

Accolades 

2011 Karnataka State Film Awards
 Best Entertaining Movie
 Best Art Director — Eshwari Kumar
 Special Jury Award (Special effects) — Rajan

1st South Indian International Movie Awards
 Best Film

References

External links 

Films set in Bangalore
2011 films
2011 action thriller films
2011 action drama films
Indian action thriller films
Films scored by V. Harikrishna
Indian romantic action films
Films based on adaptations
2010s Kannada-language films
2010s romantic action films
Films directed by Dinakar Thoogudeepa